Soup and Fish is a 1934 American pre-Code comedy short released by Metro-Goldwyn-Mayer, produced by Hal Roach and directed by Gus Meins, and starring Thelma Todd and Patsy Kelly. It is the 5th entry in the series.

Cast
Thelma Todd as Thelma
Patsy Kelly as Patsy
Billy Gilbert as Count Gustav
Gladys Gale as Mrs. Dukesberry
Don Barclay as the 1st Butler
Ernie Alexander as Dog Hospital Interne
Baldwin Cooke as the 4th Butler
Charlie Hall as the 2nd Butler
Alphonse Martell as the 3rd Butler
Virginia Karns as Daughter
Eric Mayne as Man receiving electric permanent 
Ellinor Vanderveer as Society Matron

References

External links 
 Soup and Fish at the Internet Movie Database